Alan Kearney (born 11 August 1987) is a footballer who currently plays in the National Premier Leagues Victoria 2, Australia.

Kearney joined the Everton F.C. academy in 2003 from Maymount Celtic and represented the club at Under 17, Under 18, Under 19 and Reserve level. In February 2007 he joined League Two side Chester City on loan from Everton.

After relocating to Australia, Kearney played for several seasons at Southern Stars FC before joining South Melbourne FC ahead of the 2013 season.

In January 2014 he left South Melbourne FC and signed with Dandenong Thunder and was their vice captain for the 2014 NPL Victoria season.
In late 2014, Kearney signed for Port Melbourne Sharks ahead of the 2015 season.

On 2 February 2018 it was announced that Alan had joined Dandenong City for the 2018 season.

References

1987 births
Living people
Sportspeople from Cork (city)
Association football midfielders
Republic of Ireland association footballers
Everton F.C. players
Chester City F.C. players
Cobh Ramblers F.C. players
Expatriate soccer players in Australia
National Premier Leagues players
South Melbourne FC players
Port Melbourne SC players